IUT may refer to:

 Implementation under test, a term used in technological vulnerability analysis, particularly protocol evaluation
 Institut universitaire de technologie (University Institute of Technology) in France
 International Union of Tenants headquartered in Stockholm, Sweden
 Inter-universal Teichmüller theory in number theory
 Isfahan University of Technology in Iran
 Islamic University of Technology in Bangladesh